"Down" is a song by the band 311. It is the first song on their third album, 311. It was their first #1 single on the Billboard Alternative Songs charts, and along with their self-titled album, was largely responsible for launching them into mainstream success. An accompanying video for the song was in rotation on MTV at the time of its release. Due to its massive popularity it was also included as the first song on their live album, Live, and on their greatest hits album, Greatest Hits '93–'03. Since its release it has also become a staple of their live concerts, and is usually dedicated "to all the old-school 311 fans." However, following the terrorist attacks on September 11, 2001, it was placed on the list of post-9/11 inappropriate titles distributed by Clear Channel.

"Down" was released as downloadable content for the music video game Rock Band 3 on October 2, 2012. It has also been featured in other video games such as Big Air Freestyle, BMX XXX, and Major League Baseball 2K7.

Composition

On the lyrical inspiration, Nick Hexum said, "It was the idea, 'If I ever didn't thank you, then just let me do it now.' It was both to our fans and me saying to the other band members, 'What a trip it's been to come from Nebraska, with pretty much nothing but a dream, and then to see it come true, and the unity we have in the band - the all for one, one for all spirit.'"

"Down" contains dancehall vocals, hard rock guitars and turntable scratches. At Spin, the song was compared to the band Bad Brains, and described it as having a "dynamic" verse.

Music video
The music video consists of the band performing in a warehouse and includes scenes of the band members singing the song in various backgrounds, such as a rotating coin, a circle with flowing sparks, dancing in front of a paper wall display. Also included are scenes in which the band members are meditating with an obese spiritual man who sometimes floats in the air through the power of meditation while one of the band members experiences it.

Track listing

Charts

Cover versions
Grindcore band Anal Cunt parodied the song on their 1997 album I Like It When You Die with the title "311 Sucks." It features the riff of "Down" and rapped gibberish nonsense lyrics, concluding with lead singer Seth Putnam screaming "You fucking suck!"

On July 20, 2018, The Offspring released a cover version of this song, while 311 released a "reggaefied" version of the latter's "Self Esteem". Those cover versions coincided with the beginning of their 2018 Never Ending Summer co-tour.

See also

List of Billboard Modern Rock Tracks number ones of the 1990s

References

External links
 

1996 singles
311 (band) songs
Songs written by Nick Hexum
Songs written by SA Martinez
1995 songs
Capricorn Records singles